Louis Bétournay (November 13, 1825 – October 30, 1879), educated at the Collège de Montréal, was a lawyer and judge who was born in Saint-Lambert, Quebec, and died at Saint-Boniface, Manitoba.

In 1872, Bétournay became a judge in what was the newly-proclaimed province of Manitoba. The appointment was to the Court of Queen's Bench, making him the first French Canadian to be appointed to a superior court in the west. The posting was to Fort Garry, where he was soon involved in the legal aftermath of the Red River Rebellion. His court ordered the trial of Louis Riel’s lieutenant, Ambroise-Dydime Lépine, for the death of Thomas Scott.

References

External links 
 Biography at the Dictionary of Canadian Biography Online
 Manitoba Historical Society - Louis Bétournay

1825 births
1879 deaths
Judges in Manitoba
Lawyers in Manitoba
People of the Red River Rebellion
People from Saint Boniface, Winnipeg
Franco-Manitoban people
People from Saint-Lambert, Quebec
Collège de Montréal alumni